The 110th edition of the Paris–Tours cycling classic was held on 9 October 2016. The race was part of the 2016 UCI Europe Tour, ranked as a 1.HC event. Fernando Gaviria became the first Colombian winner of Paris–Tours with a late attack in the final kilometer. Frenchman Arnaud Démare was second, Belgian Jonas Van Genechten third.

Route

The edition featured no significant climbs.

The event was exceptionally scheduled one week before the Road World Championships in Qatar, because of milder temperatures in Qatar later in October. Organizers adjusted the race finale, as they wanted to emulate the flat world championship course, spurring prominent sprinters to contest this year's Paris–Tours.

Teams
188 riders of 24 teams started the race. Each team had a maximum of eight riders:

Results

References

External links
Official website

2016 UCI Europe Tour
Paris–Tours
Paris-Tours
Paris-Tours